Lucien Musset (26 August 1922 – 15 December 2004) was a French historian, specializing in the Duchy of Normandy and the history of the Vikings.

Biography
Born in Rennes, Musset served as a professor of history at the University of Caen.

Selected works
Musset's major works include:
 Les Peuples scandinaves au Moyen Âge (Scandinavian Peoples in the Middle Ages), Presses universitaires de France, Paris, 1951, 352 p.
 Les Invasions : les vagues germaniques (Invasions: The Germanic Waves), Presses universitaires de France, Paris, 1965
 Les Invasions ; le second assaut contre l’Europe chrétienne VIIe−XI siècles (Invasions: The Second Assault Against Christian Europe, 7th – 11th Centuries), Presses universitaires de France, Paris, 1965
 Nordica et normannica : recueil d’études sur la Scandinavie ancienne et médiévale, les expéditions des Vikings et la fondation de la Normandie (Nordica and Normannica: collection of essays on ancient and medieval Scandinavia, the Viking expeditions and the founding of Normandy), Société des études nordiques, Paris, 1997
 "Naissance de la Normandie" ("Birth of Normandy"), in Michel de Boüard (editor), Histoire de la Normandie, Privat, Toulouse, 1970, p. 75-129

See also
 Georges Dumézil
 Claude Lecouteux
 François-Xavier Dillmann

References 
 

1922 births
2004 deaths
Writers from Rennes
Academic staff of the University of Caen Normandy
French male non-fiction writers
20th-century French historians
20th-century French male writers